Nathan James Robertson (born 30 May 1977) from Cotgrave in Nottinghamshire is a retired English badminton player who has achieved international success in both the men's events and the mixed doubles event. He was educated at Dayncourt School Specialist Sports College.

Career

2004 
Robertson best results include winning gold at the 2004 European Championships in Geneva, and a silver medal at the 2004 Olympic Games, both partnering Gail Emms in the mixed doubles. He has won six medals at the Commonwealth Games, and has won the last four men's doubles (with Anthony Clark) and the last two mixed doubles (with Gail Emms) at the English National Championships.

2004 Summer Olympics 
Robertson competed in badminton at the 2004 Summer Olympics in men's doubles with partner Anthony Clark. They defeated Patapol Ngernsrisuk and Sudket Prapakamol of Thailand in the first round, then were defeated in the round of 16 by Eng Hian and Flandy Limpele of Indonesia, who had previously represented England for a brief period.

He also competed in mixed doubles with Emms. They had a bye in the first round and defeated Björn Siegemund and Nicol Pitro of Germany in the second. In the quarterfinals, Robertson and Emms beat Chen Qiqiu and Zhao Tingting of China 15–8, 17–15 to advance to the semifinals. There, they beat Jonas Rasmussen and Rikke Olsen of Denmark 15–6, 15–12.  In the final, they lost to Chinese pair Zhang Jun and Gao Ling 1–15, 15–12, 12–15 to finish with the silver medal.

2005 World Championships 
At the 2005 World Championships, Robertson and Emms began the tournament as number 1 seeds. However, after getting a bye into the second round, he received an ankle injury during practice and they were forced to withdraw.

2006 
The 2006 Commonwealth Games brought Robertson a silver in the team event and a gold in the mixed doubles with Emms.

The same year, he won the gold medal at the 2006 World Championships together with Emms. They beat Anthony Clark and Donna Kellogg 21–15, 21–12 in the final.

2008 Beijing Games 
Robertson and Emms did well in their first match in the mixed doubles with a win over the Chinese pairing who were world number 2. The 2006 world champions took the first game 21–16 before Gao Ling and Zheng Bo hit back to win the second 21–16. The British duo found themselves 12–17 down in the decider only to show great powers of recovery to triumph 21–19. Along with his partner, Gail Emms, they lost out on a medal at the quarter final stage.

2009 World Championships 
Robertson was part of the English team forced to withdraw from the 2009 World Championships held in Hyderabad, India because of a terrorist threat.

Racket 
Nathan Robertson used the Carlton Fireblade Tour racket.

Retirement 
Nathan Robertson announced his retirement on 5 June 2012.

Achievements

Olympic Games 
Mixed doubles

World Championships 
Men's doubles

Mixed doubles

Commonwealth Games 
Men's doubles

Mixed doubles

European Championships 
Men's doubles

Mixed doubles

World Junior Championships 
Mixed doubles

BWF Superseries 
The BWF Superseries, which was launched on 14 December 2006 and implemented in 2007, is a series of elite badminton tournaments, sanctioned by the Badminton World Federation (BWF). BWF Superseries levels are Superseries and Superseries Premier. A season of Superseries consists of twelve tournaments around the world that have been introduced since 2011. Successful players are invited to the Superseries Finals, which are held at the end of each year.

Men's doubles

Mixed doubles

  BWF Superseries Finals tournament
  BWF Superseries Premier tournament
  BWF Superseries tournament

BWF Grand Prix 
The BWF Grand Prix had two levels, the BWF Grand Prix and Grand Prix Gold. It was a series of badminton tournaments sanctioned by the Badminton World Federation (BWF) which was held from 2007 to 2017. The World Badminton Grand Prix has been sanctioned by the International Badminton Federation from 1983 to 2006.

Men's doubles

Mixed doubles

  BWF Grand Prix Gold tournament
  BWF & IBF Grand Prix tournament

BWF International Challenge/Series 
Men's doubles

Mixed doubles

  BWF International Challenge tournament
  BWF/IBF International Series tournament

References

External links 
 

1977 births
Living people
People from Cotgrave
Sportspeople from Nottinghamshire
Sportspeople from Nottingham
English male badminton players
Badminton players at the 2000 Summer Olympics
Badminton players at the 2004 Summer Olympics
Badminton players at the 2008 Summer Olympics
Olympic badminton players of Great Britain
Olympic silver medallists for Great Britain
Olympic medalists in badminton
Medalists at the 2004 Summer Olympics
Badminton players at the 1998 Commonwealth Games
Badminton players at the 2002 Commonwealth Games
Badminton players at the 2006 Commonwealth Games
Badminton players at the 2010 Commonwealth Games
Commonwealth Games gold medallists for England
Commonwealth Games silver medallists for England
Commonwealth Games bronze medallists for England
Commonwealth Games medallists in badminton
World No. 1 badminton players
Medallists at the 1998 Commonwealth Games
Medallists at the 2002 Commonwealth Games
Medallists at the 2006 Commonwealth Games
Medallists at the 2010 Commonwealth Games